Eldon Bernard Schuster (March 10, 1911 – September 4, 1998) was an American prelate of the Roman Catholic Church. He served as bishop of the Diocese of Great Falls in Montana from 1961 until 1977.

Biography

Early life 
Eldon Schuster was born in Calio, North Dakota, to John Francis and Leona Marie (née Osborn) Schuster. He attended Loras College in Dubuque, Iowa, and the Catholic University of America in Washington, D.C.

Priesthood 
Schuster was ordained to the priesthood for the Diocese of Great Falls  on May 27, 1937.He made his postgraduate studies at Oxford University in England (1938–39) and served as vice-chancellor of the diocese (1941–1943). Schuster served as rector of St. Ann's Cathedral (1943–1946) before attending St. Louis University. He became superintendent of Catholic schools in the diocese in 1946, and was named a domestic prelate in 1949.

Auxiliary Bishop and Bishop of Great Falls 

On October 30, 1961, Schuster was appointed auxiliary bishop of Great Falls and titular bishop of Amblada by Pope John XXIII. He received his episcopal consecration on December 21, 1961, from Archbishop Egidio Vagnozzi, with Bishops William Joseph Condon and Joseph Michael Gilmore serving as co-consecrators. Following the death of Bishop Condon, Schuster was named the fourth bishop of Great Falls on December 2, 1967. After ten years as bishop, Schuster resigned;  Pope Paul VI accepted his resignation on December 27, 1977.

Eldon Schuster died on September 4, 1998, at age 87.

References

1911 births
1998 deaths
People from Cavalier County, North Dakota
Roman Catholic bishops of Great Falls
20th-century Roman Catholic bishops in the United States
Loras College alumni
Catholic University of America alumni
Alumni of the University of Oxford
Saint Louis University alumni
Participants in the Second Vatican Council
Catholics from North Dakota